Herald Malaysia is a multilingual Malaysian Catholic weekly newspaper. It publishes in English with additional language sections inside in Chinese, Tamil and Malaysian languages.

Circulation
It has a circulation of 15,600 copies in Malaysia. It is printed in English, Malay, Tamil and Chinese, and meant for distribution to Malaysian Catholics.

Newspaper sections

 Cover News
 Forum & Reflection
 Home News
 International News
 Editorial
 Opinion
 Focus
 Focus: Faith Alive
 Focus: Children
 Focus: Youth
 Chinese
 Bahasa Malaysia
 Weekly reading
 Supplements
 Today's Shalom

Government threats and censorship

The Herald newspaper nearly lost its publishing licence for using the word "Allah" as a translation for "God," with authorities saying it should only be used by Muslims.  The weekly was warned not to print "Allah" in the future, but instead it mounted an ongoing legal challenge to revoke the ban on the word, which is also used in the Malay-language Bible.

See also
 Religious freedom in Malaysia
 Roman Catholicism in Malaysia

References

External links
 

Publications established in 1980
Catholic newspapers